Elitzur Ramla may refer to:
 Elitzur Ramla B.C., a basketball club based in Ramla in Israel
 Elitzur Ramla (women's basketball), a women's basketball team from Ramla, Israel